TRNA (cytosine38-C5)-methyltransferase (hDNMT2 (gene), DNMT2 (gene), TRDMT1 (gene)) is an enzyme with the systematic name S-adenosyl-L-methionine:tRNA (cytosine38-C5)-methyltransferase. This enzyme catalyses the following chemical reaction:

 S-adenosyl-L-methionine + cytosine38 in tRNA  S-adenosyl-L-homocysteine + 5-methylcytosine38 in tRNA

The eukaryotic enzyme catalyses methylation of cytosine38 in the anti-codon loop of tRNAAsp(GTC), tRNAVal(AAC) and tRNAGly(GCC).

See also 
 TRDMT1

References

External links 
 

EC 2.1.1